The Nenets Autonomous Okrug (Nenets: Ненёцие автономной ӈокрук, Nenjocije awtonomnoj ŋokruk) is a federal subject of Russia and an autonomous okrug of Arkhangelsk Oblast. Its administrative center is the town of Naryan-Mar.

A plan to merge the autonomous okrug with Arkhangelsk Oblast was presented by the governors of both federal subjects on 13 May 2020, with a referendum planned for September, but was met with opposition by locals,
leading to the merger process being scrapped completely.

Geography

The arctic ecology of this area has a number of unique features derived from the extreme temperatures and unique geologic province. Polar bears are found in this locale; in fact, the sub-population found here is a genetically distinct taxon associated with the Barents Sea region. The autonomous okrug has a size of approximately 177,000 km2, more than four times the size of Switzerland or around the same size as the U.S. state of Missouri. The district is around 320 km from north to south and around 950 km from east to west, stretching from Mys Bolvansky Nos in the north to the source of the Oma River in the south and Cape Kanin Nos in the west to the banks of the Kara River in the east.

The okrug has a number of peninsulas - from west to east these are: Kanin peninsula, Svyatoy Nos peninsula, Russkiy Zavorot peninsula and the Yugorsky Peninsula. There are a number of islands off the Nenets coast - from west to east the most important are Kolguyev Island, Sengeyskiy Island, Dolgiy Island, the Gulyayevskiye Koshki Islands, Lovetskiy Island, Pesyakov Island, Dolgy Island, Bolshoy Zelenets Island, Vaygach Island, Oleniy Island and Mestnyy Island. Of these, Kolguyev and Vaygach are by far the largest, being the 119th and 156th largest islands in the world.

Administrative divisions

The okrug is administratively divided into one district (Zapolyarny District) and one town of okrug significance (Naryan-Mar). The district is further divided into selsoviets. Municipally, the town of Naryan-Mar is incorporated as Naryan-Mar Urban Okrug, while the district (including the settlement of Kharuta, which geographically is an exclave surrounded by the territory of the Komi Republic) is incorporated as Zapolyarny Municipal District.

History

Early history
The first recorded mention of the Nenets people is found in the 11th-century Primary Chronicle, a chronicle of Kievan Rus' from about 850 to 1110, originally compiled in Kiev about 1113 by Nestor the Chronicler. At the time, Kievan Rus was under the influence of Novgorod, as was the whole of the North Eastern territories of Kievan Rus'. By the end of the fifteenth century, Novgorod's influence was waning and the area fell under the control of Muscovy and in 1499, they established, Pustozyorsk (literally meaning deserted lakes), and it became a military, commercial, cultural and administrative hub for the area.

By the 18th century, the area was part of Mezensky Uyezd. In 1891, Pechorsky Uyezd was established and in 1896, so was Neskaya Volost. Prior to the formation of the autonomous okrug, this area belonged in part to Mezensky Uyezd in Arkhangelsk Oblast and partly to Izhmo-Pechorsky Uyezd in Komi (Zyriansky) Oblast.

Soviet history
The area now known as Nenets Autonomous Okrug was officially created on July 15, 1929, and at that time included Kanino-Timansky District, Peshsky and Omsky Selsoviets, Mezenskaya Volost and Mezensky Uyezd, Telvisochno-Samoyedsky District, Pechorsky Uyezd, and Izhmo-Pechorsky Uyezd of Komi-Zyryan Autonomous Oblast. At this time, two administrative districts, Canino-Timansky and Bolshezemelsky were founded. In December 1929, further additions were made to the District's area, namely Pustozyorskaya Volost, Pechora District and a number of offshore islands. In 1934, a number of islands, including Vaygach Island were subsumed into the district. Naryan-Mar was elevated to town status in 1935. In July 1940, a third administrative district was formed, Amderminsky, with its administrative headquarters in Amderma. However, on November 23, 1959, all administrative districts were abolished and a number of areas, including the administrative area for Vorkuta, were transferred to the jurisdiction of the Komi Republic and the region took the shape that it still holds today.

Recent history
Zapolyarny Municipal District, one of the youngest districts in Russia, was formed in 2006. Zapolyarny translates as "beyond the polar [circle]", and the district was given this name because the vast majority of the district's area lies north of the arctic circle.

Economy

Oil and gas
The economy of Zapolyarny district is dominated by oil and gas, constituting around 99% of all industrial activity within the whole Okrug. The dominance of oil and gas exploration within the Okrug has seen associated revenues increase dramatically, with €190 million generated in 2007 compared to only €6.7 million ten years prior, with fuel industry's share of the districts GRP increasing from 65% in 2001 to 80% in 2005. This increase in revenue has resulted from a marked increase in investment in the area by the parent companies of the concerns operating in the District, such as Rosneft, Lukoil, Total, Surgutneftegas and TNK-BP, whose input equates to approximately 90% of the total annual investment in the district. This investment has included the construction of an oil terminal in the Barents Sea at a cost of approximately €700 million by an independent company especially created to oversee the construction and administration of the terminal, a pipeline to connect the terminal to the ZPS Southern Khylchuyu oilfields at a cost of around €250 million, the completion of the Kharyaga-Indiga pipeline and a gas plant near Khumzha. This allows the transportation of oil and gas throughout the region and into the general Russian pipeline network. There are currently more than 80 separate oil and gas sites of exploration, and it is estimated that there is around 5 billion tons of oil and around 500 billion cubic meters of gas in the district.

In the first quarter of 2009, industrial production grew by 34.7% compared with the same period last year However, investments in industrial and housing construction decreased by 60.6% and 90.9% respectively, in the first three months of 2009, oil production totaled 4,419 million tons, an increase of over 35% on the same period in the previous year

Infrastructure
As a result of the significant and speedy increase in investment in the area, the district is faced with a widespread infrastructure problem meaning that progress at many of the oil and gas exploration sites is hampered by accessibility issues, compounded by the severe arctic climate of the district. The Duma of Nenets Autonomous Okrug has stated their intention to address this issue as a priority, including the construction of the third phase of the Naryan-Mar-Usinsk road, construction of a Naryan-Mar-Telviska-Velikovisochnoye pipeline and a renovation of the wastewater treatment system in Iskateley.

Further plans by Russian railways include the construction of two railways linking settlements in Zapolyarny Municipal District, one, a line running 210 km from Vorkuta, in the Komi Republic, to Ust-Kara in the far east of the district, and another running from Sosnogorsk, also in the Komi Republic, to Indiga in the west of the district. Officials have also proposed that the line to Ust-Kara be extended to Amderma to provide adequate transportation routes to allow the economic extraction of several mineral deposits, with an estimated worth of between €100–135 billion.

Without this investment in infrastructure, the main means of transportation is air, with regular flights to Moscow, Saint Petersburg, Arkangelsk and Usa. In the summer, the main river in the district, the Pechora is used to transport freight.

Indigenous economy
Reindeer husbandry is considered central to the Nenets' way of life, despite only 14% of Nenets people being involved in herding directly at the end of the twentieth century. There are three types of reindeer in the district: collective, personal and private. The majority of reindeer are owned by collective farms, with Nenets people employed to look after them. Those employed in such a capacity are then permitted to own additional personal reindeer, which do not require registration, nor a permit for grazing. The private reindeer are held by the association of reindeer herders, Erv, but these are very much the minority, with reports in 1997 indicating that over 70% of reindeer were held collectively, over 20% personally and only just over 2% privately.

The reindeer are kept, not only to provide for the families of the herders, but also to produce meat and antlers for sale. This meat is mainly sold within the district, since the price of reindeer meat has traditionally been lower than pork or beef, but there are other markets in the Komi Republic and Arkhangelsk Oblast. These outlets are used mainly by groups such as Erv, which have come into existence since the collapse of the Soviet Union. Those groups that effectively represent a continuity of the old collective farm economy, such as Vyucheiskiy and Kharp, generally continue to provide their reindeer to a slaughterhouse as they have always done, which results in lower profits than are generated through Erv's business plan, causing instability and debt amongst the collective farms though it is recognised that these collective farms do provide employment to those who would otherwise be without jobs.

There has been little significant change in the organisation of the reindeer herding enterprises between Soviet times and today, with little change in the number of businesses and those that continue to exist still practising the same business model, making changes only to the branding of the business.

Demographics
Population:

Vital statistics
Source: Russian Federal State Statistics Service

Ethnic groups
According to the 2021 Census, the ethnic composition was:
Russians: 69.6%
Nenets: 18%
Komi: 6.5%
Others: 5.9%

Historical figures are given below:

Ethnographic maps shows the Nenets living throughout the Okrug, with the east-central section of the okrug, along the Komi Republic border, showing mixed Nenets-Komi population.

Sport
Governor Igor Koshin has had talks with the Russian Bandy Federation about developing bandy.

See also

Music in Nenets Autonomous Okrug

References

Notes

Sources
T. Tuuisku, Transition Period in the Nenets Autonomous Okrug: Changing and Unchanging Life of Nenets People. First published in: ed. E. Kasten, People and the Land: Pathways to Reform in Post-Soviet Siberia, 2002, p. 189–205. Berlin: Deitrich Reimer Verlag
The Norwegian Barents Secretariat – Barents Monitoring, Nenets Autonomous Okrug, First Quarter, 2009

External links 
Official website of Nenets Autonomous Okrug

 
1929 establishments in the Soviet Union
Russian-speaking countries and territories
States and territories established in 1929